Jack Cosgrove  "Bluey" Watkins (1893-1974) was an Australian rugby league footballer.

Career
He played , with seven test matches for his country, including the 1921–22 Kangaroo tour of Great Britain. He is listed on the Australian Players Register as Kangaroo No. 92.

Watkins played for just one club in the New South Wales Rugby Football League premiership throughout his career which spanned 14 years, interrupted by the First World War. He played in over 100 matches for the Eastern Suburbs side between 1913 and 1926, winning Premierships with that club in 1913 and 1923. Watkins also won City Cups with the Easts club in 1914, 1915 and 1916.

After enlisting in the First World War, Watkins was chosen to play a series of matches for Australian Imperial Forces (AIF) against England.

Bluey Watkins died on 13 July 1974, age 82.

Sources
 Heads, Ian and Middleton, David (2008) A Centenary of Rugby League, MacMillan Sydney

References

1893 births
1974 deaths
Australasia rugby league team players
New South Wales rugby league team players
Australia national rugby league team players
Australian military personnel of World War I
Australian rugby league players
Rugby league locks
Sydney Roosters players
Sydney Roosters captains
Rugby articles needing expert attention